The Dangerous Dogs Act 1991 is an Act of the Parliament of the United Kingdom prohibiting or restricting certain types of dogs and codifying the criminal offence of allowing a dog of any breed to be dangerously out of control. After eleven horrific attacks in 1991, Home Secretary Kenneth Baker promised "to rid the country of the menace of these fighting dogs". The Act has been controversial for failing to stem the rise of dog attacks and for focusing on a dog's breed or looks instead of an individual dog's behaviour.

Introduction
The 1991 act was introduced by then Home Secretary Kenneth Baker, and was amended in 1997. The Act applies in England, Wales and Scotland, with The Dangerous Dogs (Northern Ireland) Order 1991 having a similar effect in Northern Ireland. The intention of the Act was the protection of the people. Prior to the Act there were no criminal penalties for injuries or deaths caused by dog attacks.

In summary:
Section 1, Dogs bred for fighting, prohibits the ownership of certain types of dogs, unless exempted on the Index of Exempt Dogs. It was intended to have a preventative effect.
Section 2, Keeping dogs under proper control, creates a criminal offence of allowing any dog (of any breed or type) to be dangerously out of control, and legal action may be taken against the dog's owner.
Section 3, Destruction and disqualification orders, covers orders for destruction of dogs, and orders for prohibiting offenders from the keeping of dogs for a period of time.

Britain has a long history of various dog legislation in attempts to protect the public. In the ninth century, dog-owners were fined if their dog bit a person. In 1839, fines were exacted for allowing dogs to run loose in London, and owners were liable if their unmuzzled dog attacked a person or other animal. In 1847, it became a criminal offence to let a dangerous dog run loose. The power to confiscate dogs was introduced in 1871. Prohibition of owning a dog as a penalty was available in 1989. The 1991 Act banned four types of dog, and made it an offence for an owner to allow any dog "to be dangerously out of control". In 1997, the Act was amended, relaxing rules and giving courts more flexibility about euthanasia orders. And in 2006, local authorities were empowered to ban dogs from certain public areas to reduce menace and fouling by dogs.

Section 1 (Breed Specific Legislation)
Under the Act, it is illegal to own certain dogs without an exemption from a court. The Act bans the breeding, sale and exchange of these dogs, even if they are on the Index of Exempted Dogs.

The Act applies to four types of dogs:
 Pit Bull Terrier
 Japanese Tosa
 Dogo Argentino
 Fila Brasileiro
The first two are explicitly mentioned in the Act, and the final two were added by the Secretary of State in 1991.

The Act also covers cross-breeds of the above four types of dog. Dangerous dogs are classified by "type", not by breed label. This means that whether a dog is prohibited under the Act will depend on a judgement about its physical characteristics, and whether they match the description of a prohibited "type". This assessment of the physical characteristics is made by a Dog Legislation Officer (DLO), a police officer experienced in dog handling and dog legislation, who assists in the investigation of dog-related allegations of crime.

Index of Exempted Dogs
The process for getting a Section 1 dog exempted includes proving to the court that the dog is not a danger to public safety, that it is owned by a 'fit and proper' person to be in charge of a dog, that the dog is already neutered and microchipped, and that the owner has obtained third-party insurance that would cover an incident of bodily injury or death of a person caused by the dog. Ongoing conditions include keeping the dog at the address listed, notifying of address changes, notifying of the death or export of the dog, keeping the dog muzzled and on a lead in public places, keeping the dog securely to prevent escape, and maintaining all previous conditions for the life of the dog.

The Act established the Index of Exempted Dogs and the Animal Welfare section of the Department for Environment, Food and Rural Affairs (Defra) oversees  the administration of the Act and the Index.

Initially, dogs born before 30 November 1991 were eligible to be put on the Index of Exempted Dogs (a grandfather clause). Applications were received for over 8,000 dogs; 5,223 dogs received their Certificate of Exemption. Dogs born after 30 November 1991 were not eligible to be on the Index, and it was expected the Index would cease after the death of the last of the original 5,223 dogs. However, the 1997 amendments expanded eligibility, effectively continuing the Index. As of 2015, there were 3,001 Pit bull terriers on the Index, 6 Dogo Argentinos, 0 Fila Brasilieros, and 3 Japanese Tosas. As of 2018, there were 3,514 Pit bull terriers, 3 Japanese Tosas, 13 Dogo Argentinos, and 0 Fila Brazilieros.

Reception and responses

The Royal Society for the Prevention of Cruelty to Animals and the British Veterinary Association are both against the breed-specific legislation provisions of the Act (Section 1), mainly on the basis that there is no scientific evidence that all individuals of a breed are dangerous. However, data from the Metropolitan Police shows that in incidents involving 'dangerously out of control dogs' banned breeds account for about 20% of offences. Defra says "a large number of serious cases from a very small population of dogs in circulation, and that is striking evidence that there is an issue with this particular type of dog", while a Member of Parliament said "Despite the fact that dogs on the exempt list must be muzzled in public, that breed still accounts for almost 20% of all reported attacks. We know also that pit bulls have been involved in seven of the 31 fatal attacks that have occurred since 2005. That is highly disproportionate for one type of dog that is banned, and it underlines the need to be cautious about change in this area."

The act only covers dog attacks causing physical injury to a human, not physical injury or death to other animals, and does not cover mental injury to a human witnessing such an attack (PTSD, for example). Efforts have been made to get the law changed. In some cases, injuries to humans have been ignored or not taken seriously by authorities because they were caused during a dog-on-dog attack.

A 2018 proposal by PETA to have the Staffordshire Bull Terrier and American Bulldog added to the list of banned dogs spawned a petition in support of the Staffordshires which garnered 160,000 signatures. The proposal was debated by Parliament and rejected. George Eustice declared, "The Government have no plans at all to add Staffordshire bull terriers, or any other type of dog, to the list of prohibited dogs."

The act has been described as a piece of rushed legislation which was an overreaction to a transient public mood. The Act is sometimes cited as an unfavourable example of such legislation, and in January 2007, the act was included in public responses to a BBC Radio 4 poll of unpopular UK legislation.

A 1992 case involving a dog named Dempsey, a pit bull terrier which three years later had its destruction order reversed, brought interest because of the lack of discretion that the Act gave magistrates regarding Section 1 dogs. Discretion was granted to magistrates with the 1997 amendment to the Act.

In the case of R (Sandhu) v. Isleworth Crown Court, the claimant Sandhu was in prison and sought to nominate a temporary keeper to have his dog.  The judicial review held that a person does have the right to nominate a person to temporarily keep the dog.  This decision has more recently been more regulated to only allow for temporary keepership in certain circumstances.

See also
 Fatal dog attacks in the United Kingdom
 Breed-specific legislation
 Dog attack
 Dogs Act
 Dog licence
 Dog bite
 Dog bite prevention
 Status dog

Notes

References

Bibliography
The Turbulent Years Hardcover  – 13 Sep 1993 by Kenneth Baker pge 433-36

External links
 DDA Watch - Organisation offering free advice and support to owners affected by the Dangerous Dogs Act. Campaigning for workable dog laws
 BBC Article on a dog attack - July 2005
 BBC Article on a dog attack - January 2007
 BBC Article "How do you fend off a dangerous dog?"
 Deed Not Breed: UK Campaign fighting the addition of any new breed to the DDA.
 Independent Article On Dog Attack June 2010.

UK Legislation 
 

United Kingdom Acts of Parliament 1991
Animal welfare and rights legislation in the United Kingdom
Dog law in the United Kingdom